The Chile women's national handball team is the national team of Chile. It is governed by the Chilean Handball Federation, and takes part in international handball competitions.

The team participated in the 2009 World Women's Handball Championship in China, finishing 23rd.

Results

World  Championship
2009 – 23rd
2023 – Qualified

Pan American Championship
2009 – 3rd
2011 – 5th
2015 – 9th
2017 – 7th

South and Central American Championship
2018 – 4th
2021 – 5th
2022 –

Central American Championship

Pan American Games
2011 – 5th
2015 – 8th
2023 – Qualified as host

Junior Pan American Games
2021 – 4th

Other Tournaments
2017 Women's Four Nations Tournament – 3rd
2017 Bolivarian Games – 
2018 South American Games – 
2019 Pan American Games repechage qualification tournament – 3rd
2022 Bolivarian Games – 
2022 South American Games – 5th

Record against other teams at the World Handball Championship

World Junior Championship

Record against other teams at the World Youth Championship

World Youth Championship

Record against other teams at the World Youth Championship

Current squad

References

External links

IHF profile

National team
Women's national handball teams
Women's national sports teams of Chile